Ladell Betts (born August 27, 1979) is an American football coach and former running back who is currently the running backs coach at the University of Iowa. He was drafted by the Washington Redskins in the second round of the 2002 NFL Draft. He played college football at Iowa.

Early years
Betts grew up as an only child with a single mother who worked two and three jobs to make ends meet. He and his mother moved from Kansas City, Missouri, to the suburb of Blue Springs when Betts was a child, but he remained very close to his father who has always been an active influence on Ladell over the years. He attended Blue Springs High School, where he would become a football star. He was teammates with fellow future NFL player Brandon Lloyd.

Betts, who was also a sprinter in high school, gained 1,813 yards and had 34 touchdowns as a high school junior. As a senior, he rushed for 2,183 yards and 32 touchdowns while playing most of the season with a broken right hand. Betts, who led his team to a 10-1 record, was named USA Today's Missouri Player of the Year after earning first-team all-state and all-metro honors. He also earned the Thomas Simone Award, which goes to the best high school player in the Kansas City area, and was named a Parade and SuperPrep All-American.

College career
After redshirting in 1997 at the University of Iowa, Betts played in all 11 games as a freshman.  He set school records for rushing yards in a game and a season by a freshman.  Betts led the team in rushing for the season and was Iowa's offensive MVP in four games.  He was an honorable mention All-Big Ten selection.

In 1999, Betts started all 11 games, led the team in rushing again, and was named Iowa's co-MVP.  He was also a second-team All-Big Ten selection.  As a junior in 2000, Betts started every game and accounted for Iowa's entire rushing offense.  He had 1,090 yards rushing in 2000; the Iowa Hawkeye team had 1,090 yards rushing that year.  Betts was an honorable mention All-Big Ten selection.

Betts again led Iowa in rushing as a senior, starting every game.  He was Iowa's co-captain and co-MVP for the 2001 season, and he was named second-team All-Big Ten.  He helped lead the Hawkeyes to the Alamo Bowl that season, but he had only two carries before being forced to leave due to an injury in Iowa's 19-16 win.

Betts started 43 games in his career and finished as Iowa's #2 all-time leading rusher with 3,686 career yards.  He scored 25 touchdowns in his career and added 702 yards receiving.  He is the only Hawkeye to ever lead the team in rushing in four different seasons.

Betts came to the University of Iowa to play for Hall of Fame coach Hayden Fry.  But Fry retired after Betts' freshman season, and Betts played his last three years for Kirk Ferentz.

Professional career

Washington Redskins
Betts was drafted in the second round (56th overall) of the 2002 NFL Draft by the Washington Redskins. He played his first game when the Redskins met the San Francisco 49ers on September 22, 2002.  On December 22, 2002, he set career highs, rushing for 116 yards and a touchdown.  At the end of the season, Betts rushed 65 times for 307 yards his rookie season.  He also had a touchdown of 27 yards.  Betts caught 12 passes for 154 yards which included a 40-yard long.  He led the team in kickoff returns, returning 28 for 690 yards (a 24.6 average).

Betts played nine games in 2003.  He finished the season with 225 rushing yards, two touchdowns, and 59 kick return yards.  Betts also caught 15 passes for 167 yards.  He missed seven games due to a fractured left forearm.

As a backup to Clinton Portis, Betts rushed for 371 yards on 90 carries (4.1 average) and a touchdown in 2004.  He had 15 catches for 108 yards.  His longest run was a 27-yarder against the Minnesota Vikings when Portis was injured.

Betts missed three games in 2005 due to injury but managed to play in 12.  He finished the season with 338 yards on 89 carries and a touchdown.  He caught ten passes for 78 yards and a touchdown pass.  In Week 10 against the  Tampa Bay Buccaneers, Betts made his first kickoff return for a touchdown of his career with 94-yarder.

In the 2006 season, Betts set career highs in several different areas as he filled in for the injured Clinton Portis, starting nine games as well as receiving significant carries spelling the end of Portis' tenure.  He totalled 1,154 rushing yards with a 4.7 yards per carry average and four rushing touchdowns.  He also caught 53 passes for 445 yards and one touchdown.

On December 10, 2006 Betts set a career-high with 171 yards rushing in a game.

Betts is the only running back in the history of the Redskins franchise to record consecutive 150 yard rushing games.

In a 2009 preseason game against the Baltimore Ravens, his jersey misspelled his last name as it said Bettis, as most would consider thinking about former Steelers halfback  Jerome Bettis.

He was released on March 4, 2010.

New Orleans Saints
Betts signed a one-year contract for the New Orleans Saints on August 16, 2010. He was cut on September 3, 2010. However, after Reggie Bush suffered a broken leg in the Saints' second game, the Saints again signed Betts on September 22, 2010.  He sustained a neck injury and concussion in a Week 11 game against Seattle, and ultimately was placed on the injured reserve list on December 8, 2010.

NFL career statistics

Coaching career
Betts joined the coaching staff at his alma mater Iowa in 2021.

References

External links
 Ladell Betts on Twitter
 Iowa profile

1979 births
Living people
Sportspeople from Kansas City, Kansas
People from Blue Springs, Missouri
Players of American football from Kansas
Players of American football from Missouri
Coaches of American football from Kansas
Coaches of American football from Missouri
African-American players of American football
American football running backs
Iowa Hawkeyes football players
Washington Redskins players
New Orleans Saints players
High school football coaches in Florida
Iowa Hawkeyes football coaches
21st-century African-American sportspeople
20th-century African-American sportspeople